Hauppauge High School is a public high school and part of the Hauppauge Union Free School District located in Hauppauge, Suffolk County, Long Island, in the U.S. state of New York.

Academics 

Hauppauge High School was named the 373rd-top U.S. high school of 2008 by Newsweek magazine, which placed it seventh among schools ranked in Suffolk County, and in the top 10% of U.S. schools. Hauppauge has a high number of students enrolled in Advanced Placement (AP) courses, of which eighteen are offered:

 Department of Social Studies: World History, United States History, United States Government and Politics
 Department of Science: Biology, Physics 1, Physics C, Chemistry, Environmental Science
 Department of Mathematics: Calculus AB, Statistics
 Department of Languages: French Language and Culture, Spanish Language, German Language and Culture
 Department of English Language Arts: English Literature and Composition, English Language and Composition
 Department of Music: Music Theory
 Department of Art: Art History, Studio Art

Notable alumni

 Nick Fanti (Class of 2015) – Baseball player
 Lori Loughlin (Class of 1982) – Actress
 Tom Postilio (Class of 1988) – Real estate broker, Star of HGTV’s Selling New York, Singer
 Gary Flood (Class of 2003) – Soccer player
 Vince Giordano (Class of 1970) – Leader of the famous jazz group, Vince Giordano & the Nighthawks
 Gary Berntsen (Class of 1975) – Central Intelligence Agency (CIA) career officer. Author, Jawbreaker: The attack on bin Laden and al-Qaeda: A personal account by the CIA's key field commander.
 Val James (Class of 1975) – First American-born, African-American, professional ice hockey player in the NHL.
 Michael Fitzpatrick (Class of 1975) – NYS Assemblyman

References

External links

 Hauppauge High School Website

1965 establishments in New York (state)
Educational institutions established in 1965
Public high schools in New York (state)
Schools in Suffolk County, New York